Ostrobothnia is a region in western Finland. It borders the regions of Central Ostrobothnia, South Ostrobothnia, and Satakunta. It is one of four regions considered modern-day Ostrobothnia, hence also referred to as Coastal Ostrobothnia to avoid confusion.

Ostrobothnia is one of two Finnish regions with a Swedish-speaking majority (the other being the constitutionally monolingual province of Åland); Swedish-speakers make up 51.2% of the total population. The region contains thirteen bilingual municipalities and one that is exclusively Finnish-speaking. The capital of Vaasa is predominantly inhabited by Finnish speakers, whereas smaller towns and rural areas are generally dominated by the Swedish language. The three municipalities with the largest number of Swedish speakers are Korsholm, Jakobstad and Pedersöre.

Geographically, Ostrobothnia has little topographical relief, because it is mostly former seafloor brought to surface by post-glacial rebound and the accumulation of alluvial sediment. Ostrobothnia has both vast expanses of cultivated fields (lakeus) as in Southern Ostrobothnia, and the archipelago of Kvarken (Finnish: Merenkurkku). Glacial transport has deposited large quantities of rocks in the area. Like elsewhere in Pohjanmaa, rivers are a prominent part of the landscape. The major rivers that discharge into the Gulf of Bothnia in Ostrobothnia are Kyrönjoki, Lapuanjoki and Ähtävänjoki.

Kaskinen, a coastal town located in the southern part of the region, is the smallest town in Finland in terms of both area and population.

Name and symbols 
Prior to the officialization of the names of the Finnish regions, Ostrobothnia was also known as Vasa kustregionen in Swedish and Vaasan rannikkoseutu in Finnish, both of which translate into "[the] coastal region of Vaasa". The Institute for the Languages of Finland recommended that the region be named Kustösterbotten in Swedish and Rannikko-Pohjanmaa in Finnish, meaning "coastal Ostrobothnia" in English. However, upon the confirmation of the names of the Finnish regions on 26 February 1998, the current name of the region was officialized instead, according to the wishes of the regional government. The central government cited the Swedish language's prevalence in the region, as well as the lack of a common consensus on an alternative name the reasons for its decision. In local circles or communities, Ostrobothnia is often referred to as "Pampas". The word derives from the similarities in the flat landscape with the Pampas area in South America.

The regional tree is the black alder (Alnus glutinosa), the regional mammal is the common elk (Alces alces), the regional stone is Vaasa granite and the regional song is "The march of Vaasa".

Coat of arms 
Gules, a sheaf Or; on chief countercharged four ermines 2+2 courant.

The sprouting wheatsheaf is a symbol of the Royal House of Vasa; a Vasa king established the city of Vaasa, the capital of the region. The running stoats are a symbol of Ostrobothnia.

Municipalities and languages

The region of Ostrobothnia is made up of 14 municipalities, of which six have city status (marked in bold), and the links are only in the majority language names. The greater Vaasa region has about 40% Swedish native speakers and a Finnish majority, whereas the Jakobstad region has about 70% and the southern region about 57% Swedish speakers. The rural part of the Vaasa region has a sizeable Swedish-speaking majority, with the majority of native Finnish speakers in Ostrobothnia as a whole living in Vaasa city proper. Isokyrö is a former unilingually Finnish municipality of the region, but was transferred to South Ostrobothnia in 2021.

Ostrobothnia is similar to German-speaking South Tyrol in Italy, in that the main language spoken in its capital is the majority language of the country, but the main language spoken in the region as a whole is a minority language. The main difference is that Swedish is an official language throughout Finland, but German is an official language only within South Tyrol.

Former municipalities:
 The current Vörå is the result of consolidation of Maxmo and Oravais.
 Nykarleby has been merged with Jeppo, Munsala and Nykarleby landskommun.
 Korsholm has been consolidated from the five municipalities of Korsholm, Replot, Björköby and Kvevlax.
 Vaasa has been merged with parts of Solf and Korsholm.
 Pedersöre has been merged with Esse and Purmo.
 Malax has been consolidated from the municipalities of Malax, Petalax, Bergö and the northern part of Pörtom.
 Närpes has been merged with Övermark and Pörtom.
 Kristinestad has been consolidated from Kristinestad, Tjöck, Lappfjärd and Sideby.
 Kronoby is consolidated from Kronoby, Nedervetil and Terjärv.
 Isokyrö is joined to the South Ostrobothnia region.

Climate
Ostrobothnia is located in the borderlands between the humid continental and subarctic climates (Köppen Dfb/Dfc). Its winters are moderated by prevailing westerly winds from the mild North Atlantic Current travelling across Norway, Sweden and the Bay of Bothnia. Although the sea tends to easily freeze over in winter during prolonged spells of cold weather due to the low salinity, winters seldom get severely cold.

In general during latter decades, the southern Bothnia Bay coastlines of central Norrland in Sweden across the strait and Ostrobothnia mostly range from slightly above  average highs in summer to about  highs and  lows in winter. Due to the vastness of the region from north to south, this will vary by a bit from one place to another depending on latitude.

Precipitation is quite variable but is enough to build up a reliable snowpack all through the region during winter months. In summer, Ostrobothnia experiences perpetual civil twilight due to its high latitude with the sun angle never falling below -3° at summer solstice in Vaasa and -2° in Jakobstad. During that time of the year, daylight remains bright enough to permit daytime outdoor activities without artificial lighting especially under clear skies. As a result, days are short during winter although all areas of Ostrobothnia are far south of the Arctic Circle.

Politics
Results of the 2019 Finnish parliamentary election in Ostrobothnia:

 Swedish People's Party   47.23%
 Social Democratic Party   15.09%
 Finns Party   11.19%
 National Coalition Party   7.38%
 Christian Democrats   6.74%
 Centre Party   4.16%
 Left Alliance   3.54%
 Green League   3.51%
 Seven Star Movement   0.24%
 Blue Reform   0.20%
 Other parties   0.72%

See also
Finnish national road 8 (E8)
Swedish dialects in Ostrobothnia

References

External links 

Regional Council of Ostrobothnia

 
Regions of Finland